The Wanderers Stadium  (Imperial Wanderers due to  sponsorship reasons  and affectionately known as the Bullring due to its intimidating atmosphere) is a stadium situated just south of Sandton in Illovo, Johannesburg in Gauteng Province, South Africa. Test, One Day and First class cricket matches are played here.  It is also the home ground for the Highveld Lions, formerly known as Gauteng (Transvaal) and as of 2023, the Joburg Super Kings.

Sponsorship 
In 2020, Imperial Logistics acquired the sponsorship rights to the stadium. The stadium is officially named Imperial Wanderers Stadium until the end of the agreement in 2025.

History
The stadium has a seating capacity of 34,000, and was built in 1956 to replace the Old Wanderers Stadium. It was completely overhauled following South Africa's readmission to international cricket in 1991. In 1996, five new  floodlight masts replaced the existing four  masts, enabling day-night limited-overs cricket. It is nicknamed 'The Bullring' due to its design and intimidating atmosphere.

On 1 October 2004, the Wanderers Clubhouse was virtually destroyed by fire. At that stage it was known as Liberty Life Wanderers, but as from the 2008/09 season, Bidvest Group took up the sponsoring of the ground, thus it became Bidvest Wanderers Stadium until the end of September 2019.

On 4 October 2019, the Wanderers Stadium announced a new naming rights deal with Imperial Logistics. The stadium is now referred to as Imperial Wanderers Stadium.

Domestic hosting
The stadium had also hosted the 2009 Indian Premier League's second semi-final and the final in which the Deccan Chargers beat the Royal Challengers Bangalore to grab the championship title.

The stadium also hosted the final of Champion League Twenty20 in the 2010 and 2012 edittion 

The Wanderers Stadium also hosted a rugby union test match in April 1980 between South Africa and the South American Jaguars while Johannesburg's normal venue, Ellis Park Stadium, was being redeveloped.

Trivia
The ground is among the most historically significant cricket grounds of the twenty-first century. It has staged some of the most important matches in ODI and T20I history, and has witnessed a number of outstanding world records.

The 2003 Cricket World Cup final was held at the Wanderers Stadium. This stadium also hosted one of the greatest One-day international matches, played between South Africa and Australia in which a world record score of 434 was chased down by South Africa. 

On 18 January 2015, the Wanderers stadium saw South Africa's AB de Villiers break the 19-year-old record for fastest ODI half-century, previously held by Sri Lankan maestro Sanath Jayasuriya, by making 50 off 16 balls against the West Indies. In the same match, he also broke Corey Anderson's fastest ODI century record (held for one year and seven days) by making 100 off 31 deliveries. He finished on 149, caught on the boundary in the final over, scored off 44 balls with a strike rate of 338.63.

On 21 February 2016, AB de Villiers scored the fastest 50 (21 balls) for South Africa in a T20I against England.

In July 2018, the stadium hosted former US President, Barack Obama at the Nelson Mandela Lecture.

See also
List of Test cricket grounds
List of international cricket centuries at the Wanderers Stadium
List of international five-wicket hauls at the Wanderers Stadium

References

External links 

Sports venues completed in 1956
Sports venues in Johannesburg
Cricket grounds in South Africa
2003 Cricket World Cup stadiums
Highveld Lions
Test cricket grounds in South Africa